Rockabye Baby! is a series of CDs geared toward infants and newborns, containing instrumental lullaby versions of popular rock bands including The Beatles, The Rolling Stones, and Led Zeppelin.  This CMH Records series debuted in 2006, and garnered many reviews from the music and entertainment industry, including MTV, The Boston Globe, Chicago Sun-Times, Entertainment Weekly, InStyle magazine, ABC World News, and The Washington Post.  Rockabye Baby CDs were included in gift bags given to all of the survivors of the 2010 Cholera outbreak in Port-au-Prince, Haiti. The series is produced by Lisa Roth, sister of Van Halen frontman David Lee Roth.

In 2011, Rockabye Baby! released their five-year anniversary compilation, Good Day, Goodnight, a 2-CD set featuring songs from previously released albums as well as several new songs.

 there are 50+Rockabye Baby! albums on the market, from a diverse of artists, such as Journey, Björk and Kanye West. The Spokesman Review said "the series is designed for modern-music-minded parents who want to share songs like Paranoid Android with their kids without scarring them for life."

Several songs from the 2006 Rockabye Baby! release, Lullaby Renditions of Nirvana appear in the 2015 Kurt Cobain biographical film, Montage of Heck, directed by Brett Morgen. On February 4, 2018, the Rockabye Baby! version of Nirvana's "All Apologies" appeared in a Super Bowl commercial for T-mobile.

Reviews
 Rockabye Baby has been reviewed in the national media and child-rearing magazines Parents, Parenting, American Baby and Child.
 Rockabye Baby! Baby's Favorite Rock Songs, which was available exclusively at Starbucks March 23-April 19, 2010, reached #3 on Billboard’s Kids' Albums chart, #18 on the Billboard Independent Albums, and #111 on the Billboard Top 200.
 Rockabye Baby! and Hushabye Baby CDs were featured on Good Day LA's "Style File: Jill's Favorite Baby Gifts" on December 9, 2009.

Awards
2007 Greatest Product - iParenting Media Award for three of their albums: Lullaby Renditions of Green Day, Lullaby Renditions of The Rolling Stones, and Lullaby Renditions of U2.
Best Kids' Album - The 2007 ESKY (Mini) Awards - (Esquire)
Favorite Audio/Video Source - Baby and Children's Product News
Cribsie Award for Catchiest Kids Tune - First annual Cribsie award with over 135,000 votes cast

Discography

References

External links
 

Children's music albums